Rahugh or Ráith Aeda Meic Bric is an early Christian site founded by Áed mac Bricc (also referred to as Saint Hugh of Rahugh) in the 6th century, inside a ráth or ringfort. The site, located about 8 km north of Tullamore along the L1024.   

Rahugh consists of one pub (The Hazel Bar and Lounge) a Catholic church, local community centre, a primary school and several small -medium-sized enterprises such as Dunnes Workshop and Scally Precast. Rahugh also contains the remains of an ancient Christian monastery site and graveyard, a holy well and a so-called headache stone.

Rahugh (Irish: Ráth Aodha) is a civil parish in County Westmeath, Ireland. It is located about 20 kilometres (12 mi) south–south–west of Mullingar. Rahugh is one of 8 civil parishes in the barony of Moycashel in the Province of Leinster. The civil parish covers 4,987.5 acres (20.184 km2). The Rahugh civil parish comprises 12 townlands: Ardan, Atticonor, Cappanrush, Garryduff, Kiltober, Lowertown, Monasset, Montrath, Pallasboy, Rahugh, Rossbeg and Sonnagh.

The neighbouring civil parishes are: Newtown to the north, Kilclonfert (County Offaly) to the east, Ballycommon (County Offaly) to the south and Durrow and Kilbeggan to the west. The nearest GAA team for the residents of Rahugh is Tyrrellspass, a neighbouring village.

References

External links
http://www.offalytourism.com/businessdirectory/rahugh
http://www.irishpubs.com/Pub?Id=93
http://www.yelp.ie/biz/the-hazel-pub-mullingar
http://www.buildingsofireland.ie/niah/search.jsp?type=record&county=WM&regno=15403823
http://www.dunnesjoinery.ie/
http://www.dunnesworkshop.com/wood-turning.php
http://www.solocheck.ie/Irish-Company/Scally-Precast-Products-Limited-374723
 Rahugh civil parish The Placenames Database of Ireland. Retrieved on 17 July 2015
 http://www.townlands.ie/westmeath/rahugh/
 http://www.thecore.com/seanruad/town_new2.php?MODE=search&TOWNLAND=&SORTBY=townland&METHOD=any&COUNTY=Westmeath&BARONY=&METHOD1=any&PARISH=Rahugh&METHOD2=any&PLU=&METHOD3=any&PROVINCE=

6th-century establishments in Ireland
Buildings and structures in County Westmeath